The Diocesan Boys' School (DBS) is a day and boarding Anglican boys' school in Hong Kong, located at 131 Argyle Street, Mong Kok, Kowloon near Mong Kok East station. The school's mission is "to provide a liberal education based on Christian principles". Having run as a grant-aided school since it was founded, the school commenced operation in the Direct Subsidy Scheme in September 2003. It uses English as the medium of instruction.

History

The first foundation 
In 1860, Mrs Lydia Smith (wife of the Bishop of Victoria) and the Society for the Promotion of Female Education in the Far East (Also known as Female Education Society, or "FES") set up the Diocesan Native Female Training School, a day-school turned boarding school for native girls, affiliated with the Diocese of Victoria. As stated in its first annual report, the purpose of the school was "to introduce among a somewhat superior class of native females the blessings of Christianity and of religious training". The school sat on Bonham Road, a small concrete house on a paddy field. Lady Robinson (the Governor's wife) became the patron.

The school had a difficult existence. The Second Opium War aroused strong anti-British sentiment and so it was very unpopular for Chinese girls to learn English. The school was closed and then reopened under the name "Diocesan Female School", but its finances did not improve. In 1868, Bishop Charles Alford took the school under his immediate superintendence.

The second foundation

19th century 

On 30 January 1869, in a bid to gain popular support, Bishop Alford issued an appeal to admit boys into the school and to turn it into an orphanage. The appeal was well received by the public. In September, the Diocesan Home and Orphanage, for boys and girls, both foreign and Chinese, was established.

In July 1870, William Arthur, formerly of the Garrison School, was appointed as the headmaster and Mrs Arthur as the matron.

In 1878, the school was placed in the grant-in-aid scheme by the Education Department.

In March 1878, Arthur resigned. Bishop Burdon proposed to stop admitting boys into the school and to bring it under the FES. In July, he withdrew his proposal following pressure from William Beswick, honorary treasurer of the DHO, although the Bishop still thought it inappropriate to have boys and girls boarding in the same school campus.

On 1 November 1878, George Piercy, then master of the Government Central School, was appointed to be the new headmaster. Piercy focused on the students' academics, and the school attained satisfactory results in the Cambridge and Oxford Local Examinations scholarships.

On 31 May 1879, the school committee resolved to stop accepting girls as boarders.

In 1891, the school was renamed the Diocesan School and Orphanage. In 1892, the remaining girls were transferred to Fairlea Girls' School (a forerunner of Heep Yunn School). The Diocesan School and Orphanage was transformed into a boys' school.

Early 20th century 
In 1902, the school was renamed the Diocesan Boys' School and Orphanage. It is unclear when the school was renamed the Diocesan Boys' School, although the name was used as early as 1918.

Rev. William Featherstone, headmaster from 1918 to 1931, introduced the prefects' system, a house system and Speech Day. He also moved the school from Bonham Road to a hill site in Mong Kok. Construction was completed in 1926. In February 1927, the British military authorities took the school for use as a hospital for one year.

When war broke out in China in 1937, the school showed its support towards the Chinese Nationalist Party. In January 1938, a shoe-shining club was organised under the permission of Rev. Christopher Sargent to raise funds for the Nationalist government. Boys went to schools around Hong Kong and polished shoes for teachers and students. In 1939, there was a school strike when a student with Japanese citizenship was appointed as head prefect.

During the Japanese occupation of Hong Kong, most of the school staff, including then-headmaster Gerald Goodban, were imprisoned. The school building was transformed into a military hospital for soldiers of the Imperial Japanese Army.

Post-war years 
Imperial Japan surrendered in August 1945. The school remained under the control of the Kempeitai until November, when all the Japanese soldiers were captured.

On 21 March 1946, J. L. YoungSaye, a senior teacher, got the school to run again. Oswald Cheung and B. J. Monks took up the post of acting headmaster successively. Goodban returned from England on 19 November 1947. Repairs started during the Christmas holidays.

In 1949, Goodban introduced a new house system in which houses were named after former headmasters, along with the Piercy Challenge Shield.

In early 1950s, construction plans for a gymnasium, a Carnegie Hall (the old art room beside the demolished gymnasium) and a science wing were proposed.

In 1955, Canon George Zimmern, also known as George She, was appointed the next headmaster, the first Hong Kong-born old boy to be given the role. As headmaster, Canon She welcomed students from poor households and affirmed the Chinese language in school culture. Canon She also introduced the Garden Fête in 1955.

It was decided that the primary classes should be dropped for lack of space and that a completely new primary school - Diocesan Preparatory School - would be built, although the decision was only implemented in 1969.

James Lowcock became headmaster in 1961. Based on his previous experience in the school, he restructured the administration to improve efficiency and appointed more teachers to posts with designated duties.

In 1983, Jacland Lai succeeded Mr. Lowcock as headmaster. A language laboratory and a demonstration room were built. The electrics and alarm installations were renovated, the school walls repainted, and the facilities were computerised throughout the school.

2000s
In 2002, Lai was succeeded by Terence Chang, an old boy and then-headmaster of Jockey Club Ti-I College.

On 4 October 2002, the school committee proposed to join the Direct Subsidy Scheme (DSS) with effect from September 2003. The application was accepted by the Education and Manpower Bureau in March 2003. The DSS was fiercely debated within the School throughout 2002. Chang was highly in favour of joining the DSS, but some students and most teachers opposed the DSS because they were afraid it would shut out students from poorer families. Alumni on the whole were slightly inclined towards the DSS. The school claimed that parents were in favour, though its findings have since been criticised as biased.

A primary school was built beside the secondary school campus. The project was financed by the government as part of the deal that saw the school join the DSS. The Diocesan Boys' School Primary Division (DBSPD) had its first, partial intake of students in 2004 and expanded its intake with students aged between 6 and 12 over the following years.

In April 2012, Diocesan Boys' School became the first secondary school in Hong Kong to have a school app on iOS and Android.

In September 2012, Chang retired and Ronnie Kay Yen Cheng – an alumnus who had been the conductor of the school choirs – succeeded him as headmaster.

In May 2020, the school became the world's No.1 International Baccalaureate school, with an average mark of 42.

Heads and houses

Roster of heads

Campus

The school is located on Kadoorie Hill in Ho Man Tin, Kowloon City District. The school campus houses a variety of different facilities.

Buildings
 The Main Building was built in 1926. It houses many classrooms, the school hall, the general office, the covered playground, the George She Christian Centre, the Music Room, the canteen and the tuck shop. It is shaped like the Chinese character "主". Between the horizontal strokes of the character, there is a parking lot (for staff), a grass field in front of the tuck shop, a rock garden (built in 1926, redesigned in 1955 by former art teacher Mr Y. T. Kwong, and subsequently redesigned again in 2020), and a glass dining hall pavilion for boarding students. The top floor of the main building formerly served as the boarding house for students until 2007, when all boarders moved to the Samuel Tak Lee Building and the premises was repurposed.
 The Science Wing, the New Wing, and the New New Wing, built in the 1956, 1961, and 1968 respectively, to house more classrooms and laboratories. The New Wing houses the NSS library and lecture hall. The New New Wing has some laboratories and classrooms for G8 and G9.
 The Gymnasium, built in 1951, was demolished in the late 2000s to make way for the auditorium (see below). The small barbecue pit next to the building was kept and now sits next to the auditorium.
 The Headmaster's Residence, built in 1952, was demolished in the late 1990s to make way for the Primary Division (see below).
Five new buildings were built between 2004 and 2012, when Terence Chang was headmaster. The buildings were designed by architect Thomas Chow (an old boy of the class of 1975), who won three awards from the Hong Kong Institute of Architects: two "Medal of the Year" awards (for his work on the Primary Division and on the Samuel Tak Lee Building respectively) and one "Merit Award – Community Building" (for his work on the Michiko Miyakawa Building and the Yunni and Maxine Pao Auditorium).
The Primary Division was opened in 2004. It includes, among other facilities, thirty classrooms, computer rooms, an assembly hall, a covered playground, two basketball courts, and an outdoor amphitheater.
The Mrs Tsai Ming Sang Building (a.k.a. the S.I.P. (School Improvement Project Building), built in 2005, houses a sky garden, 10 more classrooms for G7 and G8, laboratories, 3 multi-media learning centers, and a large staff room. "S.I.P." stands for "School Improvement Programme".
The Samuel Tak Lee Building (a.k.a. the Sports and Dormitory Complex), named after a wealthy donor (an old boy of the class of 1958), was opened in 2008 to house dormitories and common rooms for boarders, as well as a 25-metre indoor swimming pool, a new gymnasium, weight lifting facilities and additional classrooms for day boys.
The Michiko Miyakawa Building (a.k.a. the I.B. Building) opened in 2011 to provide classrooms for the newly introduced International Baccalaureate section. It contains St Augustine's Chapel and the Ronald J. Chao Library amongst labs and classrooms for the IB students.
The Yunni and Maxine Pao Auditorium, built on the site of the old gymnasium, opened in 2012. It houses the 800-seat Yip Kit Chuen Concert Hall, a couple of art galleries, and several other multi-purpose rooms.

Curriculum

The school uses English as the main language for instruction, although certain subjects (other than Chinese itself) use Chinese as the medium of instruction. Currently, both the Primary and Secondary Division follow the Hong Kong Examinations and Assessment Authority's curriculum. Students start off with a common curriculum in Grades 7 to 9. After then, most students of Grade 10 or above fall into the New Secondary System (also known as "334"), and they will take the Hong Kong Diploma of Secondary Education examinations. Another batch of Grade 10 students fall into the Pre-International Baccalaureate (Pre-IB) programme if they choose. After they complete the Pre-IB programme, they will enter the International Baccalaureate Diploma Programme (IBDP), and will graduate if they pass the IB Finals.

In March 2009, the school received media attention when a Form 4 student complained that he had had a nude female model as a subject in his art class, and alleged embarrassment. The visual arts teacher, employed for 27 years, told reporters that he had been inviting nude models without any complaint for nearly ten years. Then-Headmaster Terence Chang said it was a "big fuss about nothing".

National security education 
In December 2022, DBS said that it had already implemented national security education into its curriculum. The school stated that "The objective is to deepen students' understanding of the country's development and national security, enhance their sense of national identity and nurture them as good law-abiding citizens."

Extracurricular activities

School teams have been crowned Overall Champions in archery, athletics, badminton (Grand Slam in 2009/10 & 2010/11 in the Kowloon area), basketball (Grand Slam in 2013/14 in the Kowloon area), beach volleyball (Grand Slam in 2016/17 & 2018/19), cross country (Grand Slam in 2017/18, 2018/19 & 2022/23), fencing (Grand Slam in 2015/16 & 2016/17), football (Grand Slam in 2017/18 & 2018/19), Handball (Grand Slam in 2017/18), hockey, indoor rowing (Grand Slam in 2013/14 & 2018/19), life saving, rugby sevens, softball, squash, swimming, table tennis (Grand Slam in 1960/61, 2017/18 & 2021/22), tennis, tenpin bowling and volleyball (Grand Slam in 1977/78 in the Kowloon area, in 2017/18 & 2018/19).

The Diocesan Boys' School Music Department contains six choirs, a symphony orchestra, string and wind orchestras, a Chinese orchestra, and many chamber ensembles.

Recent achievements 

2019
 Hong Kong Schools Music Festival
 Best Mixed Choir of the Year

2018
 World Choir Games
 Male Choirs World Champion; Gold Medal
 Mixed Choirs World Champion; Gold Medal
 Musica Sacra with Accompaniment 3rd Place; Gold Medal
 Hong Kong Schools Music Festival
 Best Boys' Choir of the Year
 臺灣國際管樂節 2018
 國際管樂菁英大賽 室內樂（青少年組）
 金牌獎（木管樂五重奏）
 金牌獎（薩氏管四重奏）

2017
 Hong Kong Schools Music Festival
 Best Boys' Choir of the Year
 Best Mixed Choir of the Year
 Best Junior Choir of the Year
 Most Outstanding Secondary Choir of the Year
 Church Music Choir 1st Place

2016
 Hong Kong Schools Music Festival
 Best Boys' Choir of the Year
 Best Mixed Choir of the Year
 Church Music Choir 1st Place

2015
 Hong Kong Schools Music Festival
 Best Boys' Choir of the Year
 Best Mixed Choir of the Year
 Most Outstanding Secondary Choir of the Year
 Church Music Choir 1st Place

2014
 Hong Kong Schools Music Festival
 Best Boys' Choir of the Year
 Best Junior Choir of the Year
 World Choir Games
 Young Male Choirs World Champion; Gold Medal
 Musica Sacra with Accompaniment 2nd Place; Gold Medal
 Mixed Youth Choirs 2nd Place; Gold Medal

2013
 Hong Kong Schools Music Festival
 Best Boys' Choir of the Year
 Best Mixed Choir of the Year

2012
 Hong Kong Schools Music Festival
 Best Boys' Choir of the Year
 Best Mixed Choir of the Year
 Most Outstanding School Award
 World Choir Games
 Young Male Choirs World Champion; Gold Medal
 Musica Sacra 2nd Place; Gold Medal

2011
 Hong Kong Schools Music Festival
 Best Boys' Choir of the Year
 Best Mixed Choir of the Year
 Most Outstanding Secondary Choir of the Year
 Most Outstanding School Award
 International Brahms Choir Competition
 Brahms Grand Prize
 Mixed Voice Champion; Gold Medal
 Male Choirs Champion; Gold Medal

2010
 Hong Kong Schools Music Festival
 Best Boys' Choir of the Year
 Best Mixed Choir of the Year
 Most Outstanding Secondary Choir of the Year
 World Choir Games
 Young Male Choirs World Champion; Gold Medal
 Musica Sacra World Champion; Gold Medal

By 2022, DBS counts a total of 16 winners of the Hong Kong Outstanding Students Awards, ranking sixth among all secondary schools in Hong Kong.

Exam results 
DBS has 16 perfect scorers "10As" in the history of Hong Kong Certificate of Education Examination (HKCEE) and 2 "Top Scorers" and "Super Top Scorers" in the history of Hong Kong Diploma of Secondary Education Examination (HKDSE). Prior to 1987, the upper limit for the number of subjects is nine.

7 x 5** "Top Scorers" are candidates who obtained perfect scores of 5** in each of the four core subjects and three electives.

8 x 5** "Super Top Scorers" are candidates who obtained seven Level 5** in four core subjects and three electives, and an additional Level 5** in the Mathematics Extended (M1/M2) module.

Alumni by field

Politics and civil service

 Sun Yat-sen (孫中山) (1866-1925), Chinese revolutionary and statesman, "Father of Modern China"
 Sir Robert Kotewall (羅旭龢) (1880-1949), colonial businessman and politician
 Yeung Kai-yin (楊啟彥) (1941-2007), chairman and chief executive of Kowloon-Canton Railway Corporation (KCRC), Secretary for Education and Manpower, Secretary for Transport and Secretary for the Treasury
 James Tien Pei Chun (田北俊), former chairman of the Liberal Party and member of the Legislative Council
 Michael Tien Puk Sun (田北辰), member of the Legislative Council and former chairman of the board of the KCRC
 Tommy Cheung, Leader of the Liberal Party and member of the Legislative Council
 Dominic Lee, member of the Legislative Council and former member of the Sham Shui Po District Council
 Kenneth Chen Wei-on, Secretary-General of the Legislative Council and former Undersecretary for Education
 Eddie Yue Wai-man (余偉文), Chief Executive of the Hong Kong Monetary Authority
 Patrick Ho, former Secretary for Home Affairs, convicted of bribery offences in a U.S. federal court in 2018
 Timothy Tong, former Commissioner of the ICAC and Commissioner of Customs and Excise
 Joshua Law Chi-kong, Former Secretary for the Civil Service, Permanent Secretary for Security, Permanent Secretary for Constitutional and Mainland Affairs, and Permanent Representative to the World Trade Organization

Law
 William Ngartse Thomas Tam (1900-1976), barrister, magistrate, member of the Legislative Council
 Rev. G. S. Zimmern (施玉麒) (1904-1979), barrister, magistrate, headmaster of DBS
 Sir Cho-yiu Kwan (1907-1971), judge, member of the Executive and Legislative Councils
 Sir Yuet-keung Kan (簡悅強) (1913-2012), solicitor, member of the Executive and Legislative Councils, banker
 Sir Oswald Cheung (張奧偉) (1922-2003), barrister, member of the Executive and Legislative Councils, acting headmaster of DBS
 Aarif Barma (鮑晏明), Justice of Appeal of the Court of Appeal
 Pang Kin-kee (彭鍵基), former High Court judge and former chairman of the Electoral Affairs Commission (EAC)

Commerce
 Lam Kin Ming, chairman of Lai Sun Group
 Henry Fan, Chairman of the Hospital Authority, former Unofficial Member of the Executive Council, former managing director of CITIC Pacific and former vice-chairman of Cathay Pacific
 Canning Fok (霍建寧), group managing director of Hutchison Whampoa
 V-Nee Yeh (葉維義), founder of Value Partners (asset management) and member of the Executive Council

Education and academia
 Chan Wing Tsit (陳榮捷) (1901-1994), sinologist, professor of philosophy at Dartmouth College and Columbia University
 Tam Sheung Wai (譚尚渭), president emeritus of the Open University of Hong Kong.
 Robert Chung Ting Yiu (鍾庭耀), director of the Public Opinion Programme at HKU
 Chan Hing-yan (陳慶恩), chair of the Department of Music at HKU
 Lai Ching Lung (黎青龍), professor of medicine at HKU
 Benny Tai Yiu-ting (戴耀廷), associate professor of law at HKU, initiator of Occupy Central

Arts and entertainment
 George Lam, Cantopop star
 Li Chuan Yun, violinist
 Andrew Hin Yau Ling, violinist, violist, conductor
 Aristo Sham, pianist
 Chapman To, actor and entertainer
 Vivek Mahbubani, stand-up comedian
 Hubert Wu, Cantopop singer
 Lo King-man (盧景文), performing artist and director, "Father of Hong Kong Opera"
 Byron Mann (文峰), actor

Mass culture and journalism
 Alex Law Kai-yui (羅啟銳), film director
 Josiah Lau Ka Kit, host of "One Minute's English" (RTHK)

Sports
 Roy Lamsam (伍劭雄), cricketer
 William Hill, Olympic sprinter (1964)
 Denis Cunningham, Olympic fencer (1976, 1984), chairman of Hong Kong Fencing Association
 Lai Chun Ho (黎振浩), Olympic sprinter (2008, 2012)
 Chan Ming Tai (陳銘泰), Olympic long jumper (2016), holder of the Hong Kong record
 Ng Ka Long, Olympic badminton player (2016, 2020)
 Tan Chun Lok (陳俊樂), footballer, member of Hong Kong National Football Team, current plays for Chinese Super League club Guangzhou City
 Yue Tze Nam (茹子楠), footballer, member of Hong Kong National Football Team, current plays for Chinese Super League club Meizhou Hakka
 , Olympic foil fencer (2020)

 Coleman Wong Chak Lam (黃澤林), tennis player, winner of the Boys' Doubles titles at 2021 US Open and 2022 Australian Open
 Viking Wong (黃維俊), Brazilian jiu-jitsu practitioner and fashion designer

See also
Education in Hong Kong
List of secondary schools in Hong Kong

References

Further reading 
Rev. W. T. Featherstone, The Diocesan Boys School and Orphanage, Hong Kong: The History and Records 1869–1929 (Hong Kong: Ye Olde Printerie Ltd, 1930)
W. J. Smyly, A History of the Diocesan Boys' School (unpublished manuscript circa 1967)
The GS Book Editors, A Tribute to Rev. Canon George She Headmaster 1955–1961 Diocesan Boys' School (Hong Kong: The Green Pagoda Press, 2004)
 E. J. Eitel's letter to the Colonial Secretary in 1889, CO 129/342, quoted in Vicky Lee, Being Eurasian: Memories Across Racial Divides (Hong Kong University Press, 2004), p. 21
 Steps, Diocesan Boys' School, various years
 Y.W. Fung and M.W. Chan-Yeung, To Serve and To Lead – A History of the Diocesan Boys' School Hong Kong (Hong Kong: Hong Kong University Press, 2009)

External links

Official Homepage of Diocesan Boys' School
Diocesan Boys School Seventy Years Ago, by W. J. Howard

 
Educational institutions established in 1869
1869 establishments in the British Empire
Boys' schools in Hong Kong
Boarding schools in Hong Kong
Direct Subsidy Scheme schools
Anglican schools in Hong Kong
Protestant secondary schools in Hong Kong
International Baccalaureate schools in Hong Kong
Grade II historic buildings in Hong Kong
Mong Kok
Kowloon City District